Bacteroides is a genus of Gram-negative, obligate anaerobic bacteria. Bacteroides species are non endospore-forming bacilli, and may be either motile or nonmotile, depending on the species. The DNA base composition is 40–48% GC. Unusual in bacterial organisms, Bacteroides membranes contain sphingolipids. They also contain meso-diaminopimelic acid in their peptidoglycan layer.

Bacteroides species are normally mutualistic, making up the most substantial portion of the mammalian gastrointestinal microbiota, where they play a fundamental role in processing of complex molecules to simpler ones in the host intestine. As many as 1010–1011 cells per gram of human feces have been reported. They can use simple sugars when available; however, the main sources of energy for Bacteroides species in the gut are complex host-derived and plant glycans.  Studies indicate that long-term diet is strongly associated with the gut microbiome composition—those who eat plenty of protein and animal fats have predominantly Bacteroides bacteria, while for those who consume more carbohydrates the Prevotella species dominate.

One of the most important clinically is Bacteroides fragilis.

Bacteroides melaninogenicus has recently been reclassified and split into Prevotella melaninogenica and Prevotella intermedia.

Pathogenesis
Bacteroides species also benefit their host by excluding potential pathogens from colonizing the gut. Some species (B. fragilis, for example) are opportunistic human pathogens, causing infections of the peritoneal cavity, gastrointestinal surgery, and appendicitis via abscess formation, inhibiting phagocytosis, and inactivating beta-lactam antibiotics. Although Bacteroides species are anaerobic, they are transiently aerotolerant and thus can survive in the abdominal cavity.

In general, Bacteroides are resistant to a wide variety of antibiotics—β-lactams, aminoglycosides, and recently many species have acquired resistance to erythromycin and tetracycline. This high level of antibiotic resistance has prompted concerns that Bacteroides species may become a reservoir for resistance in other, more highly pathogenic bacterial strains. It has been often considered  susceptible to clindamycin, but recent evidence demonstrated an increasing trend in clindamycin resistance rates (up to 33%).

Microbiological applications
An alternative fecal indicator organism, Bacteroides, has been suggested because they make up a significant portion of the fecal bacterial population, have a high degree of host specificity that reflects differences in the digestive system of the host animal Over the past decade, real-time polymerase chain reaction (PCR) methods have been used to detect the presence of various microbial pathogens through the amplification of specific DNA sequences without culturing bacteria. One study has measured the amount of  Bacteroides by using qPCR to quantify the host-specific 16S rRNA genetic marker. This technique allows quantification of genetic markers that are specific to the host of the bacteria Bacteroides and allow detection of recent contamination. A recent report found temperature plays a major role in the amount of time the bacteria will persist in the environment, the life span increases with colder temperatures (0–4 °C).

Early research suggests that affects brain development.

"A new study has found that there is a three-way relationship between a type of gut bacteria, cortisol, and brain metabolites. This relationship, the researchers hypothesize, may potentially lead to further insight into autism, but more in-depth studies are needed."

Another study showed a 5.6-times higher risk of osteoporosis fractures in the low Bacteroides group of Japanese postmenopausal women.

Human
Members of the Bacillota and Bacteroidota phyla make up a majority of the bacterial species in the human intestinal microbiota (the "gut microbiome"). The healthy human gut microbiome consists of 109 abundant species of which 31 (19.7%) are members of the Bacteroidetes while 63 (40%) and 32 (20%) belong to Bacillota and Actinomycetota.

Bacteroides species' main source of energy is fermentation of a wide range of sugar derivatives from plant material. These compounds are common in the human colon and are potentially toxic. Bacteroides such as Bacteroides thetaiotaomicron converts these sugars to fermentation products which are beneficial to humans. Bacteroides also have the ability to remove side chains from bile acids, thus returning bile acids to the hepatic circulation.

There is data suggesting that members of Bacteroides affect the lean or obese phenotype in humans.  In this article, one human twin is obese while the other is lean. When their fecal microbiota is transplanted into germ-free mice, the phenotype in the mouse model corresponds to that in humans.

See also
 CrAssphage
 Cytophaga
 Flavobacterium

References

External links 
 Bacteroides infections in E Medicine
 Bacteroides in detail.

Bacteroidia
Gram-negative bacteria
Medically important anaerobes
Gut flora bacteria
Bacteria genera